B4Now (pronounced Before Now) is the debut studio album by South African rapper Blxckie, released on 21 May 2021 through M4 Entertainment. It debuted at number one in South Africa and was nominated for several awards.

The album was also certified gold in South Africa.

Background 
In early May 2021, he announced released date his debut album B4Now.

Commercial performance 
The album debuted number one in South Africa.

B4Now deluxe edition was certified gold with sales of over 10,000 units.

Release and promotion 
B4Now was released on May 21, 2021.

To further promote his album he embarked on B4Now Tour which included 10 dates.

Critical reception 
Upon its release, it received positive reviews from music  critics, Ubetoo wrote; "It's a highly relatable compilation that should have an eager  audience out there".

Track listing

Awards 

!
|-
|rowspan="2"|2021
|rowspan="3"|<div style="text-align: center;"> B4Now
|Fresheman of the Year
|
|rowspan="2"|
|-
|Album of the Year 
|
|-
|2022
|Best Hip Hop Album 
|
|

Release history

References 

2021 debut albums